Ajay S. Vinzé is an American professor and academic administrator. He was named as the Dean of the business school at George Mason University. Previously, he served as the Robert J. Trulaske Sr. Dean and Professor in the Robert J. Trulaske, Sr. College of Business at the University of Missouri. Vinzé started his tenure at the Trulaske College of Business in January 2017. Since his arrival at Mizzou, he has focused on situating the College among leading business schools nationally and internationally. Vinzé is an expert on information systems, emergency preparedness and response, disruptive innovation, ICT investments, and collaborative computing.

Early life and education 

Vinzé received his Bachelor of Commerce (Honors) at the Shri Ram College of Commerce at the University of Delhi in 1980. In 1982 he received his MBA in Finance from the University of Connecticut. He was awarded his PhD in Business Administration, Management Information Systems (MIS) is from the University of Arizona in 1988.

Career 

Vinzé started his professional career as an IT Consultant with SGV and Co. in Manila, Philippines. Then after a stint at India-Phil Textiles in Bureau Philippines he reverted to academia. After completing his PhD at the University of Arizona he joined the faculty of the Mays School of Business at Texas A&M [PLA1] (1988-1998). He then moved to the W.P. Carey School of Business at Arizona State University [PLA2] where in addition to his research and teaching contributions he assumed a variety of administrative roles including Ph.D. Program Director (August 1999-July 2002), Founder and Inaugural Director for the Center for Advancing Business through Information Technology (CABIT) (July 2002- July 2007), Director of Executive MBA Program (2007-2010), Associate Dean for International Programs (May 2012-December 2016), Associate Vice Provost for Graduate Education (May 2013- December 2016). Dr. Vinzé was award Professor Emeritus from the W.P. Carey School of Business before joining the Trulaske College of Business in 2017.

Vinzé joined the University of Missouri after nearly 20 years in teaching, research and administrative roles. Vinzé is a Fulbright Senior Specialist and a global citizen, having lived, worked or traveled through more than 70 countries over the past three decades. He maintains an active research agenda, and his work ranges from Artificial Intelligence (AI) applications for business problem solving to emergency preparedness and response.

Selected Articles and Publications 
Raghu, T. S., Rajiv Sinha, Ajay Vinze, and Orneita Burton. "Willingness to pay in an open source software environment." Information Systems Research 20, no. 2 (2009): 218-236.

Kanat, Irfan E., Sathananda Siloju, T. S. Raghu, and Ajay S. Vinze. "Gamification of emergency response training: A public health example." In 2013 IEEE international conference on intelligence and security informatics, pp. 134–136. IEEE, 2013.

References

External links
Official University of Missouri webpage

Living people
American computer scientists
University of Arizona alumni
University of Connecticut alumni
Delhi University alumni
University of Missouri faculty
Business school deans
Year of birth missing (living people)